The California Reading List is a literature database designed to help pupils that undertook standardized testing identify age appropriate and challenging reading material. Each pupils recommended list is delivered as part of the results notification for the California Standardized Testing and Reporting exams as a number between 1 and 13. In conjunction with the pupils grade level, an age appropriate recommended reading list is presented.

See also
California High School Exit Exam

External links
 California Department of Education, "California Reading List".
 startest.org, California Reading list.

Education in California
Standardized tests in the United States
Education reform